Gelnhausen is a town, and the capital of the Main-Kinzig-Kreis, in Hesse, Germany. It is located approximately 40 kilometers east of Frankfurt am Main, between the Vogelsberg mountains and the Spessart range at the river Kinzig. It is one of the eleven towns (urban municipalities) in the district. Gelnhausen has around 22,000 inhabitants.

Geography

Location

According to the Institut Géographique National from 1 January 2007 until July 2013 the geographic centre of the European Union was located on a wheat field outside the town.

Gelnhausen is located on the German Fairy Tale Route, a tourist route.

History

Gelnhausen was founded by Emperor Frederick Barbarossa in 1170, it is therefore nicknamed "Barbarossastadt". The place was chosen because it was at the intersection of the Via Regia imperial road between Frankfurt and Leipzig and several other major trade routes. Frederick had three villages connected by streets and surrounded by a wall. At the same time, Gelnhausen received town privileges and a Kaiserpfalz was erected on an island of the Kinzig river. The emperor also granted trade privileges like the staple right which forced traveling merchants to offer their goods in the town for three days.

Hence Gelnhausen initially was a thriving trade town and head of a league of 16 towns of the Wetterau region. However prosperity came to an end already in 1326 when Emperor Louis IV gave the town in pawn to the counts of Hanau, redeemed shortly afterwards. In 1349 Count Günther von Schwarzburg received Gelnhausen from Emperor Charles IV for renouncing his claims as elected King of the Romans, in condominium with the counts of Hohnstein, who sold their share to Schwarzburg in 1431. Schwarzburg was acquired in 1435 by Elector Palatine Louis III and the Hanau, since raised to a county.

Repeated plundering in the Thirty Years' War as depicted by Hans Jakob Christoffel von Grimmelshausen in his novel Simplicius Simplicissimus made it nearly uninhabitable. In 1736, the extinction of the comital line of Hanau meant the condominium share was inherited by the Landgraviate of Hesse-Kassel, who acquired the Palatinate's share ten years later.

The varying lords made continued attempts to challenge Gelnhausen's imperial immediacy, it however formally remained a Reichsstadt. During the German Mediatisation of 1803 the city became a part of the Landgraviate of Hesse-Kassel, which was raised to an electorate and, after the Austro-Prussian War of 1866, was annexed by Prussia. At this time Gelnhausen had completely recovered, and with the Gründerzeit economic boom it became a centre of the German rubber industry.

The Holocaust
During the Nazi era, Gelnhausen was reported judenfrei on November 1, 1938, by propaganda newspaper Kinzigwacht after its synagogue was closed and remaining local Jews forced to leave the town.

From the 1930s Gelnhausen was a garrison town of the German Wehrmacht and, after World War II, of the United States Army. The US Army closed Coleman Kaserne in 2007.

In 1996, the town hosted the 36th Hessentag state festival.

Arts and culture

Attractions

Sights include:

The Kaiserpfalz Gelnhausen. The castle was erected 1160-80 at the time of Gelnhausen's foundation southeast of the town on an island in the Kinzig river. The groundwork is stabilized by 12,000 logs, driven into the earth. Today it is the best preserved Kaiserpfalz from this era.
The , the most recognizable landmark of Gelnhausen. It shows both Romanesque (like the six-storey west tower) and Gothic architecture (the octagonal crossing tower and the east towers) elements. The church was built from local bunter between 1170 and 1250 by Selbold Abbey, replacing a simple chapel from ca. 1100 of which some traces remain. In 1543, Gelnhausen turned Protestant and the church became the Protestant parish church.
Its origins lie in the early 13th century; rich citizens of Gelnhausen planned to erect a church within the town, causing a conflict with the Selbold Abbey that owned the clerical patronage for Gelnhausen. This conflict was escalated up to Pope Gregory IX who decided in favour of the abbey. From the 13th to the 15th century the church was used for weddings, baptisms, and funerals. After the Reformation, the building became the property of the town. It subsequently fell into ruin and was sold in 1830 to a local merchant. After the demolition of the second tower, a cigar factory was built in it. In 1920, the Catholic community of Gelnhausen bought the church and partly restored it over an 18-year period. A complete restoration took place in 1982–3.

Governance

Town twinning

Gelnhausen is twinned with:
  Clamecy, France
  Marling, Italy

Infrastructure

Transport
Gelnhausen lies directly on the German autobahn A66. Gelnhausen station is located on the Kinzig Valley Railway, a major line between Frankfurt and Fulda. Regional services from Frankfurt to Fulda or Wächtersbach stop in Gelnhausen.

Notable people
 August Brey (1864–1937), politician, member of the Weimar National Assembly, born in Ronnenberg
  (1784–1850), naturalist and mayor of Gelnhausen
  (born 1909), film director, brother of Oskar
 Oskar Fischinger (1900–1967), film director
  (died 2008), forestry scientist and conservationist, born at Meerholz, Gelnhausen
  (c. 1500–1569), teacher, pedagogue and statesman
 Tia and Tamera Mowry (born 1978), actresses
 Klaus Ploghaus (born 1956), athlete (hammer throw, 3rd place in the 1984 Summer Olympics)
 Johann Philipp Reis (1834–1874), inventor of one of the first telephones
Friedrich Armand Strubberg (1806–1889), Merchant, physician, colonist in North America. Direct descendant of Frederick I of Sweden. Buried in Gelnhausen
 Hans Jakob Christoffel von Grimmelshausen (c. 1622–1676), writer; In his work Simplicissimus, the sacking of Gelnhausen during the Thirty Years' War is graphically described
  (born 1964), chief editor of the Cicero magazine

Like many American soldiers, in 1959 Colin Powell, then lieutenant of the 3rd Armored Division, served at Coleman Kaserne. A street was named after him. During the Second Gulf War, there was some discussion about renaming the street because of Germany's stance on the war. The mayor of Gelnhausen strongly objected.

See also
Palatinate-Birkenfeld-Gelnhausen

References

External links

 Official municipal site
 Large aerial from town centre looking NorthWest
 Stolpersteine in Gelnhausen

Free imperial cities
Main-Kinzig-Kreis